Roboré Airport ,  is a joint public/military airport serving Roboré, a town in the Santa Cruz Department of Bolivia.

The runway is between the west side of the town and the Cuartel de Roboré military barracks. There is rising terrain to the north, and a mountain to the northeast.

The Robore non-directional beacon (Ident: OBO) is located on the field.

See also
Transport in Bolivia
List of airports in Bolivia

References

External links 
OpenStreetMap - Roboré
OurAirports - Roboré
SkyVector - Roboré
Fallingrain - Roboré Airport

Airports in Santa Cruz Department (Bolivia)